Troschelvindex is a genus of land snails with an operculum: these terrestrial gastropod mollusks are in the family Pomatiidae.

Species 
Species within the genus Troschelvindex include:
 Troschelvindex agrestis (Pfeiffer, 1862)
 Troschelvindex alayoi Aguayo & Jaume, 1947
 Troschelvindex arangiana (Gundlach in Pfeiffer, 1857
 Troschelvindex auriflexum Aguayo, 1953
 Troschelvindex barbouri (Torre & Bartsch, 1941)
 Troschelvindex bebini (Arango, 1865)
 Troschelvindex candeana (d’Orbigny, 1842)
 Troschelvindex freirei Aguayo & Jaume, 1947
 Troschelvindex inculta (Poey, 1851)
 Troschelvindex jiguanensis (Pfeiffer, 1861)
 Troschelvindex minia (Gundlach in Poey, 1858)
 Troschelvindex rocai (Torre & Bartsch, 1941)
 Troschelvindex tracta (Gundlach in Poey, 1858)

References 

Pomatiidae